Parma is a genus of damselfish in the family Pomacentridae.

Species
 Parma alboscapularis Allen & Hoese, 1975 (New Zealand black angelfish)
 Parma bicolor Allen & Larson, 1979 ( Bicolor scalyfin)
 Parma kermadecensis Allen, 1987 (Kermadec scalyfin)
 Parma mccullochi Whitley, 1929 (McCulloch's scalyfin)
 Parma microlepis Günther, 1862 (White-ear scalyfin)
 Parma occidentalis Allen & Hoese, 1975 (Western scalyfin)
 Parma oligolepis Whitley, 1929 (Big-scale parma)
 Parma polylepis Günther, 1862 (Banded parma)
 Parma unifasciata (Steindachner, 1867) (Girdled scalyfin) 
 Parma victoriae (Günther, 1863) (Victorian scalyfin)

References

External links

 
Pomacentrinae
Marine fish genera
Taxa named by Albert Günther